Brixey is an unincorporated community in northern Ozark County, Missouri, United States.

A post office called Brixey has been in operation since 1917. The zip code is 65618. A variant spelling was "Brixy". The community takes its name from nearby Brixey Creek

References

Unincorporated communities in Ozark County, Missouri
Unincorporated communities in Missouri